The 1999 Belgian Open singles was the singles event of the sixth edition of the Belgian Open; a WTA Tier IV tournament and one of the most prestigious women's tennis tournament held in Belgium. The tournament had not occurred since 1993, where it was won by Radka Bobková. She did not compete this year.

Wildcard and World No. 178 Justine Henin won her first WTA title, defeating first seed Sarah Pitkowski in the final, 6–1, 6–2. This was also the first WTA tour tournament that Henin competed in, making her the fifth woman ever to win their debut WTA event.

Seeds

Draw

Finals

Top half

Bottom half

Qualifying

Seeds

Qualifiers

Lucky losers

Qualifying draw

First qualifier

Second qualifier

Third qualifier

Fourth qualifier

External links
 1999 Belgian Open Draw

Belgian Open (tennis)
Flanders Women's Open